Sungai Penuh is a city in Indonesia, in Jambi province, on the island of Sumatra. It is an enclave within Kerinci Regency, of which it was formerly part but from which it is now administratively separate. The city, whose name means "Penuh River", is also known as Siulak. It covers an area of 366.36 km2 and had a population of 82,293 at the 2010 Census, 87,032 at the 2015 Census and 96,610 at the 2020 Census; the official estimate as at mid 2021 was 97,770.

Administrative districts
At the 2010 Census there were five districts (kecamatan), but three more were added subsequently. The eight districts currently forming the city are listed below with their areas and their populations at the 2010 Census and the 2020 Census, together with the official estimates as at mid 2021. The table also includes the locations of the district administrative centres, the number of villages (urban kelurahan and rural desa) in each district, and its post code(s).

Notes: (a) except the village of Pasar Sungai Penuh, which has a post code of 37113. (b) The 2010 population of these new districts are included with that of the existing districts from which they were cut out in 2013. (c) except the village of Pondok Tinggi, which has a post code of 37114. (d) except the village of Dusun Baru, which has a post code of 37112.

References 

  https://web.archive.org/web/20101013091507/http://www.bps.go.id/aboutus.php?hasilSP2010=1

Populated places in Jambi
Sumatra
Cities in Indonesia
Cities in Jambi